Crioceratitidae is an extinct cephalopod family belonging to the subclass Ammonoidea and included in the order Ammonitida.

Genera

 Acantholytoceras Spath, 1932
 Balearites Sarkar, 1954
 Crioceratites Leveillé, 1837
 Diamanticeras Vermeulen, 2004
 Menuthiocrioceras Collignon, 1949
 Paracostidiscus Busnardo, 2003
 Pseudothurmannia Spath, 1923
 Ropoloceras Vermeulen et al., 2012
 Sornayites Wiedmann, 1962
 Spathicrioceras Sarkar, 1955
 Spinocrioceras Kemper, 1973
 Subaspinoceras Thomel et al., 1987
 Theodorites Baraboshkin and Mikhailova, 2006

References

 
Ammonitida families
Cretaceous ammonites
Early Cretaceous first appearances
Early Cretaceous extinctions